The coat of arms of Kyiv features the Archangel Michael officially named as "Saint Michael the Archistrategos" (archistrategos, chief-general in the Ancient Greece), wielding a flaming sword and a shield on an azure field.

History
The coat of arms traces its history back to the medieval principality of Kievan Rus', where the Archangel Michael was depicted on the seals used by the Kievan grand princes. Initially the coat of arms of Kyiv featured Saint George fighting a dragon on an azure field, and this today remains the coat of arms of the Kyiv Oblast. In the 16th century, a coat consisting of the Archangel Michael clad in white robes, holding a sword and a shield on a red field was adopted for the Kyiv Voivodeship. 

In 1487, along with Magdeburg rights, the city of Kyiv received a coat of arms consisting of a hand holding a crossbow.

In 1782, a new coat of arms was approved by the order of Catherine II of Russia. In the order the coat of arms  is described as "Archangel Michael in a short tunic on an azure field". Later on it was decorated with an imperial crown and other ornaments. No original image of the arms has been recovered to date. Some modern drawings of the arms exist, based on the description in Catherine's order.

In 1918, during the short time of Ukrainian independence, a coat of arms was adopted which contained, in addition to the Archangel Michael and the crossbow, a trident from the Coat of arms of Ukraine, emphasizing the city's role as the nation's capital.

In 1969, a coat of arms was introduced with chestnut leaves and a bow on the red-azure field, containing the word КИЇВ (KYIV), and such Soviet symbols as the hammer and sickle and the Hero City medal. Since 1973 the horse-chestnut leaves became one of the symbols of the city.

In May 1995, the Kyiv City Council restored the city's original coat of arms depicting the Archangel Michael.

Gallery

See also
 Flag of Kyiv

References

Coat of arms
Ukrainian coats of arms
Coats of arms of cities in Ukraine
Kyiv
Kyiv
Kyiv
Michael (archangel)